Hasalaka is a small town in Sri Lanka. It is located within Central Province.

This is the hometown Corporal Gamini Kularatne, Parama Weera Vibhushanaya recipient of Sri Lanka Army.

See also
List of towns in Central Province, Sri Lanka

External links

Populated places in Kandy District